is a Japanese international swimmer, competing in the freestyle.  At the 2003 Summer Universiade, he won the title in the Men's 200m Freestyle. He won the bronze medal in the 2004 Summer Olympics in the Men's 4 × 100 m Medley Relay.

External links
 Japanese Olympic Committee Profile

1983 births
Living people
Olympic swimmers of Japan
Swimmers at the 2004 Summer Olympics
Swimmers at the 2008 Summer Olympics
Olympic bronze medalists for Japan
Olympic bronze medalists in swimming
Asian Games medalists in swimming
Swimmers at the 2002 Asian Games
Swimmers at the 2010 Asian Games
Medalists at the 2004 Summer Olympics
Japanese male freestyle swimmers
Universiade medalists in swimming
Asian Games gold medalists for Japan
Asian Games silver medalists for Japan
Medalists at the 2002 Asian Games
Medalists at the 2010 Asian Games
Universiade gold medalists for Japan
Universiade silver medalists for Japan
Medalists at the 2003 Summer Universiade
Medalists at the 2005 Summer Universiade
21st-century Japanese people